The Johnnie Walker Australian Classic was a golf tournament held in Australia from 1988 to 1992. It was first played as the Bicentennial Classic to celebrate the Australian Bicentenary. From 1989 it was sponsored by United Distillers, using their Johnnie Walker Scotch whisky brand, and officially titled as the  Johnnie Walker Australian Classic, and then the Johnnie Walker Classic from 1991.

It was held at the Royal Melbourne Golf Club, Melbourne, except in 1991 when it was played at The Lakes Golf Club. Prize money was A$1,500,000 in 1988, A$1,000,000 from 1989 to 1991, and A$700,000 in 1992. The tournament was played for the final time in 1992 as a result of United Distillers ending their sponsorship in April 1993.

After the tournament was cancelled in 1993, the Johnnie Walker Asian Classic dropped the word "Asian" and took on the Johnnie Walker Classic title.

Winners

Notes

References

Former PGA Tour of Australasia events
Golf tournaments in Australia
Recurring sporting events established in 1988
Recurring sporting events disestablished in 1992